"Their name liveth for evermore" is a phrase from the King James Version of the Bible, forming the second half of a line in Ecclesiasticus or Sirach, chapter 44, verse 14, widely inscribed on war memorials since the First World War.

In full, verse 14 reads "Their bodies are buried in peace; but their name liveth for evermore." The chapter begins with the line "Let us now praise famous men, and our fathers that begat us." The full text of verse 14 was suggested by Rudyard Kipling as an appropriate inscription for memorials after the First World War, with the intention that it could be carved into the Stone of Remembrance proposed by Sir Edwin Lutyens for the Imperial (now Commonwealth) war cemeteries. Lutyens was initially opposed, concerned that someone might inappropriately add an "s" after "peace" ("peaces" being a homophone of "pieces"), but relented when the phrase was cut down to just the second part of the verse, omitting the reference to bodies resting in peace.

Kipling also suggested the memorial phrase "Known unto God" for gravestones marking the resting place of unidentified or unknown soldiers, possibly taken from Acts, chapter 15, verse 18—"Known unto God are all his works from the beginning of the world". The memorial phrase "lest we forget" is taken from Kipling's poem "Recessional"—"Lord God of Hosts, be with us yet / Lest we forget—lest we forget!"

Notes

References
 His words liveth for evermore, The Guardian, 11 November 2007 
 Ecclesiasticus, chapter 44, King James Version
 Acts, chapter 15, King James Version
 Return to Gallipoli: Walking the Battlefields of the Great War, Bruce Scates, p.42-43
 Commemorations: The Politics of National Identity, edited by John R. Gillis, p.153, 162
 The Cambridge Companion to Rudyard Kipling, edited by Howard J. Booth, p.91
 Making Sense of Dying and Death, edited by Andrew Fagan, p.17
 Australia: 'Known unto God' to remain, The Anglican Planet, 15 November 2013 

English phrases
War poetry